Twin Twin is a French music group from Montreuil, Seine-Saint-Denis. The group consists of Lorent Idir (of Algerian descent), François Djemel (of Algerian descent) and Patrick Biyik (of Zairese descent), and is characterised by a mixture of electro sounds, rock, and slam. Twin Twin also represented France in the Eurovision Song Contest 2014 in Copenhagen, Denmark, with the song "Moustache". They finished in last position in the grand final, a first for France in the Eurovision Song Contest, with two points.

Discography

Albums

Singles

References

Eurovision Song Contest entrants for France
Eurovision Song Contest entrants of 2014
Musical groups from Île-de-France